Rajneesh Narula (born 29 April 1963), is an economist and academic. He is Professor of International Business Regulation and Director of the John H. Dunning Center for International Business at Henley Business School, University of Reading in Reading, UK.

In 2017, he was appointed an Honorary Officer of the Most Excellent Order of the British Empire (OBE). The honour is in recognition of his Services to Business Research. He was elected a Fellow of the Royal Society of Arts, Manufactures, and Commerce (FRSA) in 2015.

He holds honorary appointments at United Nations University-MERIT, Norwegian School of Business, Oxford University and the University of Urbino.

Biography

Education 
Narula completed his early education in Nigeria, most notably at Barewa College where he was a classmate of Nasir Ahmad el-Rufai, and Katsina College of Arts, Science and Technology. He earned his BEng (Hons) in Electrical Engineering from Ahmadu Bello University in Zaria, Nigeria, in 1983, and later attended Rutgers University in New Jersey, USA, where he obtained his MBA (1988) and his PhD (1993).

Prior to academia, Narula worked as an engineer at the Nigerian College of Aviation Technology and later as a planning analyst at IBM Asia/Pacific headquarters in Hong Kong.

Career 
Narula's academic and professional interests focus on innovation, R&D alliances, emerging economies and the role of multinational enterprises in industrial development. He has held academic postings at Copenhagen Business School, University of Oslo, BI Norwegian School of Management, the University of Maastricht and Rutgers University. In addition Narula has worked for the United Nations, and has also consulted and advised a number of agencies including the European Commission and the Organisation for Economic Co-operation and Development.

Narula is Professor of International Business Regulation at the Henley Business School (2004–present). He is also the co-director of the John H. Dunning Centre for International Business and school director of research, having been the former programme director of the PhD in International Business and Strategy.

He is currently an editor of the Journal of International Business Studies (2016–present). Prior to this he was editor-in-chief of the Multinational Business Review (2014-2016), and editor-in-chief of the European Journal of Development Research (2009-2013). He is on the editorial board of more than a dozen journals.

Narula is regularly invited as commentator on business and economics issues, as seen on BBC World News, Al Jazeera, TRT World News, BBC 1, BBC Business Live, Radio 1 and Radio Berkshire, as well as a variety of print and online publications. He gives over 30 public lectures and seminars at universities around the world every year.

Selected publications
Narula is listed as one of the top 20 most cited academic authors worldwide in the fields of international business, emerging markets, the economics of innovation, and economic development, according to Google Scholar. As of December 2018 his google citation count stands close to 13,000. His publications with John H. Dunning and Sanjaya Lall on FDI-assisted development are especially well-cited contributions on the subject.

Narula's research and consulting have focused on the role of multinational firms in development, innovation and industrial policy, R&D alliances and outsourcing. He has published over a 100 articles and chapters in books on these themes.

He is the author or editor of 13 books, including Globalization and Technology (Polity Press), Multinationals and Industrial Competitiveness (with John Dunning, Edward Elgar), Understanding FDI-assisted Economic Development (with Sanjaya Lall, Routledge), Multinationals on the Periphery (with Gabriel Benito, Palgrave). He is also co-author of the acclaimed textbook International Business, with Simon Collinson and Alan Rugman, which is in its seventh edition.

His publications have appeared in leading journals, including the Journal of International Business Studies, Oxford Development Studies, Research Policy, Journal of Management Studies and Management International Review. His 2003 book, Globalization and Technology, has been translated and published in Chinese and Arabic.

Books 

 Collinson, Simon; Narula, Rajneesh; Rugman, Alan, 2017. International Business. 7th ed. United Kingdom: Pearson.
 Lall, Sanjaya; Narula, Rajneesh, 2006. Understanding FDI-Assisted Economic Development. London: Routledge.
 Dunning, John; Narula, Rajneesh, 2004. Multinationals and Industrial competitiveness: a new agenda. Cheltenham: Edward Elgar.
 Narula, Rajneesh, 2003. Globalisation and Technology: interdependence, innovation systems and industrial policy. Cambridge: Polity Press. (Chinese ed. 2011, Arabic ed. 2017) 
 Dunning, John; Narula, Rajneesh, 1996. Foreign Direct Investment and Governments: Catalysts for Economic Restructuring. London: Routledge. 
 Narula, Rajneesh, 1996. Multinational Investment and Economic Structure: Globalisation and Competitiveness. London: Routledge.

Journal articles 

 Narula, Rajneesh; Noya, Andrea Martinez (2018) What more can we learn from R&D alliances? A review and research agenda, Business Research Quarterly (forthcoming)
 Mudambi, Ram; Narula, Rajneesh; Santangelo, Grazia (2018) Location, Collocation and Innovation by multinational enterprises: a research agenda, Industry & Innovation, Business Research Quarterly, 25(3), 229-241.
 Narula, Rajneesh; Verbeke, Alain (2015) Making internalization theory good for practice: The essence of Alan Rugman’s contributions to international business, Journal of World Business 50(4), 612-622.
 Narula, Rajneesh (2014) Exploring the paradox of competence-creating subsidiaries: balancing bandwidth and dispersion, MNEs Long Range Planning, Vol 24, 4-15.
 Narula, Rajneesh (2012) Do we need different frameworks to explain infant MNEs from developing countries? Global Strategy Journal, Vol 2, 188-204.
 Driffield, Nigel; Narula, Rajneesh (2012) Does FDI cause development? The ambiguity of the evidence and why it matters, European Journal of Development Research, Vol 24, 1-7.
 Narula, Rajneesh; Santangelo, Grazia (2009) Location, Collocation and R&D alliances in the European ICT Industry, Research Policy, Vol 38, 393 – 403.
 Criscuolo, Paola; Narula, Rajneesh (2008) A novel approach to national technological accumulation and absorptive capacity: aggregating Cohen and Levinthal, European Journal of Development Research, Vol 21, 62-88.
 Narula, Rajneesh (2002) Innovation systems and ‘inertia’ in R&D location: Norwegian firms and the role of systemic lock-in, Research Policy, Vol 31 (5), 795-816.
 Dunning, John; Narula, Rajneesh (2000) Industrial Development, Globalisation and Multinational Enterprises: new realities for developing countries, Oxford Development Studies, Vol 28 (2),141-167.

See full list of journal publications via Google Scholar here.

References

External links 
 Henley Business School: https://www.henley.ac.uk/people/person/professor-rajneesh-narula
LinkedIn: https://www.linkedin.com/in/narula1/
United Nations: http://narula.unu-merit.nl/

1963 births
British economists
Living people
Academics of the University of Reading
Honorary Officers of the Order of the British Empire